Utkansu is a village in Sughd Region, northern Tajikistan. It is located near the city Istiqlol.

References

Populated places in Sughd Region